Final Fantasy VIII, a 1999 best-selling role-playing video game by Squaresoft, features an elite group of mercenaries called "SeeD", as well as soldiers, rebels, and political leaders of various nations and cities. Thirteen weeks after its release, the title had earned more than US$50 million in sales, making it the fastest selling Final Fantasy title at the time. The game has shipped 8.15 million units worldwide as of March 2003. Additionally, Final Fantasy VIII was voted the 22nd-best game of all time by readers of the Japanese magazine Famitsu in 2006. The game's characters were created by Tetsuya Nomura, and are the first in the series to be realistically proportioned in all aspects of the game. This graphical shift, as well as the cast itself, has received generally positive reviews from gaming magazines and websites.

The six main playable characters in Final Fantasy VIII are Squall Leonhart, a loner who avoids vulnerability by focusing on his duty; Rinoa Heartilly, an outspoken and passionate young woman who follows her heart; Quistis Trepe, an instructor with a serious yet patient attitude; Zell Dincht, an energetic martial artist with a fondness for hot dogs; Selphie Tilmitt, a cheerful girl who loves trains and flies the airship Ragnarok; and Irvine Kinneas, a marksman and womanizer who uses his charm to mask his insecurities. Temporarily playable characters include Laguna Loire, Kiros Seagill, and Ward Zabac, who appear in "flashback" sequences; SeeD cadet-turned-antagonist Seifer Almasy; and sorceress Edea Kramer. The main antagonist is Ultimecia, a sorceress from the future who wishes to compress time.

Concept and design

In Final Fantasy games, scenario writer Kazushige Nojima stresses the dynamic of the relationship between the player and the main character; thus, he puts significant thought into how that relationship will develop. With Final Fantasy VII, protagonist Cloud Strife's reserved nature led Nojima to include scenarios in which the player can select Cloud's responses to certain situations and dialogue. With Final Fantasy VIII, which also features a reserved lead protagonist in Squall, Nojima wanted to give players actual insight into what the protagonist is thinking, even while other characters remain uninformed: this led to the inner dialogues Squall has throughout the game.

Character designer Tetsuya Nomura, while exchanging e-mails with director Yoshinori Kitase between development of Final Fantasy VII and VIII, suggested that the game should have a "school days" feel. Nojima approved of the idea, as he already had a story in mind in which the main characters were the same age. Thus, they created the concept of military academies, called "Gardens", in which students would train to become "SeeD" mercenaries. Nojima also planned for the two playable parties featured in the game—Squall's present day group and Laguna Loire's group from twenty years in the past—to highly contrast with. Laguna's group consists of a close-knit group of battle-hardened friends in their late twenties. On the other hand, Squall's party is young and inexperienced, and Squall himself does not initially understand the value of friendship.

Kitase desired to give the game a foreign atmosphere ("foreign" being in relation to Japan), ultimately deciding on a European setting. The first character Nomura designed specifically for Final Fantasy VIII was Squall, initially giving him longer hair and a more feminine appearance. However, Kitase was unsatisfied and asked Nomura to shorten his hair and make him appear more masculine, which led to the design seen in-game. When designing Cloud, Nomura gave him distinctly spiky, bright blonde hair to emphasize his role as that game's protagonist. With Squall, Nomura wanted to try a unique angle to establish his role, giving him the characteristic gunblade scar across the bridge of his nose. A complete history was not yet conceived, so Nomura left the explanation for Squall's scar to Nojima. Squall's design was flourished by a fur lining along the collar of his jacket, included for the purpose of challenging the game's full motion video designers, who were also developing the CGI film Final Fantasy: The Spirits Within at the time. This is but one example of the demands he has consistently extended to the programmers of the series as technology has advanced.

Most Final Fantasy games include summons: creatures who are brought into battle to attack enemies or support the party. In Final Fantasy VIII, summons are called "Guardian Forces", or GFs. Nomura felt they should be unique beings, without clothes or other human-like concepts. This was problematic, as he did not want them to "become [like] the actual monsters", so he took great care in their design. Ramuh—an old wizard summon from earlier Final Fantasy games—was replaced; other human-like designs were re-imagined as nude figures or with creature-like elements. Nomura, also the director of the Guardian Force animation sequences, wanted to create a greater impact than the summon cinematics of Final Fantasy VII. Leviathan was created as a test and included in a game demo. Garnering a positive reaction from players, Nomura decided to create the remaining sequences in a similar fashion.

In a Famitsu Weekly interview with Kitase, Nomura, and Yuusuke Naoi, the team agreed that Final Fantasy VIII reflects Nomura's preferred technique, as opposed to VII, which featured characters that "weren't really his style". The team also decided to use realistically proportioned characters. The higher level of full motion video technology would have otherwise created an inconsistency between the in-game graphics and the higher definition full motion video graphics. Additionally, Kitase explained that the main logo of the game—Squall and Rinoa embracing—was inspired by the team's efforts to express emotion through body language.

Creatures and races

The world of Final Fantasy VIII is predominantly occupied by humans. Another prominent race is the "Shumi", a small tribe of creatures with yellow skin and large arms. The tribe lives in an underground village on the Trabian continent. The Shumi frown upon showing off their large hands; NORG, the owner of Balamb Garden, was exiled from the tribe for his ostentation. All Shumi undergo a biological metamorphosis at some point in their lives; a qualified Shumi will become an Elder while another may become a mute "Moomba". Moombas are covered in red fur, which the Shumi attribute to "the passionate ingenuity in their hearts". Additionally, Moombas have appeared in several Final Fantasy spin-offs, including  Chocobo World and Chocobo Racing.

Chocobos—large galliform birds common throughout the Final Fantasy series—are featured in the game. In this title, Chocobos are generally undomesticated and can be found in various forests throughout the world. Each forest has a minigame where the player must corral baby Chocobos to locate the mother. If the player catches a bird, a baby Chocobo (a Chicobo) named Boko will follow the player around. Boko has his own game called Chocobo World that can be downloaded from the PlayStation disc onto a PocketStation game unit. Series composer Nobuo Uematsu created two Chocobo themes for Final Fantasy VIII: "Mods de Chocobo" and "Odeka de Chocobo".

Final Fantasy VIII also features an array of common real world creatures, such as cats and dogs. The game also includes numerous monsters, many of which have appeared earlier in the series. Popular recurring monsters include Adamantoise, Behemoth, Bomb, Cactuar, Iron Giant, Malboro, and Tonberry.

Playable characters

Squall Leonhart

 is the main protagonist of Final Fantasy VIII. He is a young student at Balamb Garden who is identifiable by the scar on his face that a fellow student, Seifer, inflicted. He rarely speaks and has the reputation of being a lone wolf. As Squall's story unfolds, he becomes fascinated with and falls in love with Rinoa, despite never outwardly expressing such until the ending. Squall is characterized by forlorn memories of standing out in the rain at the orphanage where he grew up, wondering where "Sis" went. Squall's weapon is a gunblade, a sword that uses components of a revolver to send vibrations through the blade when triggered. His Limit Break is a series of sword strikes called Renzokuken.

Rinoa Heartilly

 is the primary female protagonist of Final Fantasy VIII. She is the 17-year-old daughter of General Caraway, a high-ranking officer in the Galbadian army, and Julia Heartilly, a successful pianist and singer. Rinoa is a member of the Forest Owls, a resistance faction seeking to liberate the small nation of Timber from Galbadian occupation. When Squall and his party of SeeD help the resistance movement fight Galbadia, Rinoa decides to stay with them; as a result she ends up falling in love with Squall. She has black hair with brown highlights and dark eyes. Outspoken, spirited, emotional, and honest with her feelings, she speaks her mind without reservation. Because of her ambition, she can often be stubborn.

In battle, she uses a weapon called a "Blaster Edge", which consists of an arm holster and a projectile that returns like a boomerang. In her Combine Limit Break, she attacks in unison with her dog, Angelo. When Rinoa gains Sorceress powers, she acquires a second Limit Break, Angel Wing, which increases her spell-casting ability, along with rendering her in a state of "magic" berserk for the remainder of the battle.

Laguna Loire
 is a man whose past and relation to the main characters are revealed slowly throughout the game. Most of the sequences involving Laguna appear in the form of "dreams" experienced by the primary protagonists. Squall always experiences these dreams from Laguna's point of view, although he does not think too highly of Laguna. Laguna attacks with a Machine gun and his Limit Break is Desperado, which involves a swinging rope, a grenade, and a barrage of bullets. During the dream segments, he is a twenty-seven-year-old soldier in the Galbadian army who travels with his companions, Kiros Seagill and Ward Zabac. He is also an aspiring journalist.

During the first two dream segments, Laguna and his team are shown getting lost and visiting the hotel where singer Julia Heartilly, Laguna's romantic interest, performs. After a scouting mission at Centra, the three soldiers are separated and Laguna is injured. A young woman named Raine nurses him back to health after he is brought to Winhill. He falls in love with and marries her. However, he is drawn away from his new home when a young girl in their care, Ellone, is kidnapped. Laguna tracks her down in Esthar, where he helps liberate the nation from the despotic rule of Sorceress Adel. The people of Esthar elect Laguna as their president and Ellone is sent back to Winhill without him. After Raine dies, her child (whom Ward and Kiros imply to be Squall in a conversation aboard the Ragnarok) and Ellone are sent to an orphanage. Laguna is unable to leave his post to visit her and remains president of Esthar to the present day. Ellone and Laguna are reunited in space, and Laguna helps the party prepare for their fight against Ultimecia.

The concept of two main characters was planned since the beginning of the game's development. Nomura tried to create a contrast between Laguna's and Squall's occupations; thus, Laguna became a soldier with a light-hearted charisma, and Squall became a reserved mercenary student. The designers intended Laguna to be more similar to the previous protagonists in the series to complement Squall, who is different from previous main characters. Laguna is ranked seventh in Electronic Gaming Monthlys list of the top ten video game politicians.

Laguna Loire appears in Dissidia 012 Final Fantasy, where he is voiced by Hiroaki Hirata in the Japanese version and Armando Valdes-Kennedy in the English version. He is featured in his youthful Final Fantasy VIII appearance while his older and his Galbadian soldier forms. His costume of a knight is also available as downloadable content. Laguna was also planned to appear in Kingdom Hearts Birth by Sleep as the head of Mirage Arena.

Seifer Almasy
 is a classmate and rival of Squall, who can only be controlled by the player during the Dollet sequence. He reappears as a boss later in the game. He acts as a foil to Squall in many respects, having dated Rinoa before she met Squall, and assuming a leadership position among his friends. Like Squall, Seifer wields a gunblade which he calls "Hyperion". His Limit Break, Fire Cross, allows him to use an attack called No Mercy. He later uses the more powerful techniques Demon Slice and Bloodfest against the player. Seifer has a short temper and is often depicted as a bully who desires attention.Quistis: "Yes! That's right! Seifer was a kid who always needed to be the center of attention. But Squall always used to ignore him... But eventually they would end up fighting." (Final Fantasy VIII) He is also fiercely independent and is often punished for his recklessness. He is the leader of Balamb Garden's disciplinary committee with his friends Fujin and Raijin. After joining Ultimecia, he becomes the leader of the Galbadian army.

During the introduction sequence, Seifer cuts Squall across the left side of his face with his gunblade, leaving a scar. Squall retaliates with a backhand slash that leaves Seifer with a mirrored scar. At the following field exam in Dollet, Seifer acts independently from his teammates Squall and Zell, abandoning them; consequently, he fails and is not promoted to SeeD. Spurred by dreams of a brighter future, he defects to Sorceress Edea so he could be her "knight". From his point of view, Squall and the others are "evil" and he recognizes himself as a hero. As Seifer is brainwashed by the sorceress, he alienates himself from his friends. Eventually, Fujin and Raijin abandon him and he is defeated shortly afterward. Following Edea's defeat, the party confronts Seifer one last time as he now serves Ultimecia, and either they or Gilgamesh defeat him. Seifer escapes, kidnapping Rinoa and bringing her to Adel. At the end of the game, Seifer is seen fishing and having fun with Fujin and Raijin.

Nomura had originally intended Seifer not only as Squall's rival, but also as part of the love triangle between him, Squall, and Rinoa. Although this concept was shelved in the final script, Seifer remains Squall's rival and his appearance was designed to contrast with Squall's. They have equivalent but mirrored scars on their faces and their jackets are of opposing color and length. Both characters use gunblades; Squall's gunblade is larger and requires two hands, while Seifer's gunblade is lighter and can be wielded with one hand. A younger version of Seifer makes an appearance in Kingdom Hearts II as a member of the Twilight Town Disciplinary Committee with Fujin and Raijin. Seifer in the virtual Twilight Town is a rival of the main character, Roxas, and at one point mentions that he does not wish to cooperate with destiny. He is voiced by Takehito Koyasu and Will Friedle in the Japanese and English versions, respectively. He is also featured in the rhythm game Theatrhythm Final Fantasy as a sub-character representing Final Fantasy VIII.

The book "Converging Traditions in the Digital Moving Image: Architectures of Illusion, Images of Truth" discusses that while Seifer is seen as a show-off and a troublemaker, protagonist Squall Leonhart identifies with him. IGN listed Seifer as the 91st best video game villain, stating that he makes for a great rival due to the similarities between him and Squall.

Quistis Trepe
 is an eighteen-year-old instructor at Balamb Garden, where Squall, Zell, and Seifer are students. She uses a chain whip in battle, and her Limit Break, Blue Magic, a common ability found throughout the Final Fantasy games, allows her to imitate monsters' attacks. Early in the game, Quistis is discharged as an instructor because she "[lacks] leadership qualities". Afterwards, she maintains a more informal relationship with the other characters as a fellow member of SeeD.

As a child, Quistis stayed at an orphanage with most of the main characters. She then lived with foster parents, with whom she never developed any intimacy, before moving to Balamb Garden at age ten. She became a SeeD at fifteen and an instructor two years later.Quistis: I was a SeeD by the age of 15, got my instructor license at 17." By this time, she has become very popular, having a number of fans who identify themselves as "Trepies". For her part, Quistis never shows any indication of being aware of their existence. Quistis initially joins Squall to prepare him for his upcoming field exam. She later takes Squall into her confidence and tells him personally about her demotion. Squall rudely tells her to go "talk to a wall", a famous comical line in the game, and not to burden him with her problems. This furthers the player's perception of Squall's awkwardness and anti-social tendencies. When Irvine refreshes the main characters' memories about the orphanage, they remember that Squall's asocial behavior began when Ellone, an older sister figure to Squall, left the orphanage unexpectedly. As a result of these revelations, Quistis recognizes that her feelings for Squall are more sisterly than romantic. Later, she criticizes Squall when he nearly abandons Rinoa, his romantic interest.

When designing the characters, Nomura had wanted at least one female character to wear a skirt. Quistis was originally supposed to fill this part, but Nomura decided a long skirt worn over pants would look better. The role was eventually passed to Selphie. Nomura was surprised when the writers cast her as a teacher, despite being around the same age as the rest of the group.

Quistis also appears in World of Final Fantasy where she is voiced by Miyuki Sawashiro in Japanese and Kristina Pesic in English.

Selphie Tilmitt

 is a student at Balamb Garden who recently transferred from Trabia Garden. Selphie first appears when running into Squall while late for class. She asks Squall to show her around because she recently transferred. During the Dollet exam, Selphie joins Squall's team after Seifer abandons them. She becomes a full-fledged SeeD with Squall and Zell, and the three are assigned to the same team. She participates in many extracurricular activities, such as planning the Garden Festival and running the school's website. Selphie wields nunchaku in battle, and her Limit Break Slot allows the player to cast a random spell numerous times as well as certain magic used exclusively in her limit break. She also pilots the Ragnarok starship.

Zell Dincht
 is a student at Balamb Garden with Squall and Seifer. Seventeen years old, Zell is a martial artist who fits the role of unarmed character, just like Tifa Lockhart did in the previous game, Final Fantasy VII. Zell attacks with punches and kicks, his weapons being gloves, and his Limit Break, Duel, requires the player to input button combinations on the controller to deal damage. Zell is slightly impulsive and overconfident in his own skill, but is loyal to his friends. Seifer gives him the nickname "chicken-wuss", which infuriates him. He also has a passion for hot dogs; a recurring gag is that they are always sold out by the time he reaches the cafeteria.

Zell lived at the same orphanage as many of the other protagonists; this is where Seifer first began to bully him. He was later adopted by the Dincht family in the town of Balamb. His motivation for enrolling at Garden is to live up to the memory of his grandfather, a famous soldier.

Zell was designed to look and act like the main character of a shōnen manga (Japanese comic books intended primarily for boys); his neighbors in Balamb describe him as a "'comic-bookish' type of hero". He also thinks of himself as Seifer's rival, despite not being the main character. The inspiration for the tattoo on his face came from an MTV music video that featured a man with a full body tattoo.

Zell's ultimate weapon is named Ehrgeiz, directly referencing the game of the same name which came out around the same time Final Fantasy VIII did. Also, continuing the similarities to Tifa Lockhart of Final Fantasy VII, Zell has a limit break called Dolphin Blow as does Tifa, Zell's final limit break is My Final Heaven, while Tifa's was called just Final Heaven.

He is voiced by Noriaki Sugiyama in Japanese.

Irvine Kinneas
 is a student at Galbadia Garden, one of the three mercenary academies in the game. He is one of the Garden's elite sharpshooters, always carrying his rifle. His Limit Break is Shot, which deals damage and inflicts status effects depending on the type of ammunition. Irvine is depicted as a cowboy, tall and fair-skinned with long brown hair that he wears pulled back in a ponytail. He also enjoys flirting with the female characters, being known as well for his marksmanship as his charm. He acts like a carefree, but misunderstood loner; however, this is merely a façade to charm women and hide his lack of confidence.

When Sorceress Edea becomes the Galbadian ambassador, Balamb and Galbadia Gardens order Squall's team to assassinate her; Irvine is introduced as the sniper for the mission. Moments before the assassination attempt, he explains to Squall that he always chokes under pressure. In spite of his nerves and under intense pressure, he fires an accurate shot, but Edea uses magic to stop the bullet. At Trabia Garden, Irvine reveals that he and most of the other party members had lived in the same orphanage, run by Cid and Edea Kramer. However, the others could not remember this because of their use of Guardian Forces (GF), magical beings who cause severe long-term memory loss as a side effect. Because Irvine had not used a GF until he joined the party, he is able to remember his past. During the game, Irvine gradually draws closer to Selphie, acting on the feeling he has had since living with her at the orphanage.

With Irvine, Nomura tried to strike a balance between not overshadowing Squall and not becoming too unattractive. He gave Irvine a handsome appearance, but a casual personality, hoping that this would make him less attractive than Squall. Keeping with this idea, Nomura gave him goggles, but this idea was abandoned in favor of an American cowboy-like appearance to set him apart from other goggle-wearing characters in the Final Fantasy series.

He is voiced by Daisuke Hirakawa in Japanese.

Kiros Seagill
 is one of Laguna's comrades in the Galbadian Army. He wields a pair of katar (कटार) or gauntlet-daggers, with which he repeatedly slices his enemies in his Limit Break, Blood Pain. His weapons' name is given as "katal" in the English localization of the game. Following the failed mission in Centra, Kiros is separated from Laguna and Ward. He heals quickly and decides to leave the Galbadian army, but soon finds that life without Laguna lacks excitement. His subsequent search for Laguna brings him to Winhill after nearly a year. When Laguna is forced to leave Winhill to find Ellone, Kiros accompanies him, helping him earn money as an amateur actor to fund the expedition. Kiros remains by Laguna's side throughout his adventures in Esthar, earning a place as Laguna's advisor when he becomes president. Like Ward, Kiros' interactions with Laguna are based on the staff's interactions during development.

Ward Zabac
 is Laguna's other comrade. An imposing man, he wields a large harpoon in battle; in his Limit Break, Massive Anchor, he uses it to crush his opponents from above. During the incident at Centra, he loses his voice in a battle with Esthar soldiers. After being separated from Laguna and Kiros, he becomes a janitor at the D-District Prison. When Laguna becomes president of Esthar, Ward joins Kiros as an advisor, directing affairs with gestures and ellipses. Laguna and Kiros can understand what he is saying by his reactions. Like Kiros, Ward's interactions with Laguna are based on the staff's interactions during development.

Edea Kramer

 is initially presented as a power-hungry sorceress who seizes control of Galbadia from President Deling. Her motives are unknown, but SeeD dispatches Squall to assassinate her. The mission fails after Rinoa is taken over by an unknown entity and Edea sends a bolt of ice through Squall's chest. Later, it is revealed that Edea is actually the wife of Headmaster Cid, and was known as "Matron" to Squall and the other kids that lived at the orphanage. It is eventually explained that Edea was not acting of her own will, but was possessed by a sorceress from the future named Ultimecia. When Ultimecia's control is broken, Edea takes the side of the SeeDs in the struggle and joins Squall's party for a short time. However, she accidentally gives her powers to Rinoa, making her a sorceress. Being a sorceress, Edea attacks with magical bursts of energy and her Limit Break, Ice Strike, consists of a magically conjured icicle, hurled like a javelin.

Other characters
Adel
 is a sorceress from Esthar who initiated the Sorceress War some years ago before the start of the game. As the ruler of Esthar, she ordered her soldiers to abduct every girl to find a suitable successor for her powers, including the young Ellone. During the Esthar revolution, Laguna and Dr. Odine devised an artifact to cancel the sorceress power, and placed her in suspended animation in outer space. In the present, after Edea is released from Ultimecia's control, Ultimecia possesses the new sorceress, Rinoa, and commands her to free Adel, so she can become Ultimecia's new and more powerful vessel. Adel is successfully freed, so Rinoa is discarded as a host. However, in order to defeat Ultimecia, Dr. Odine plans for Ultimecia to once again possess Rinoa. Eventually, Squall's party defeats Adel when she tries to absorb Rinoa at the Lunatic Pandora, thus Adel's powers transfer to Rinoa, Ultimecia possesses her again, and using Ellone's powers, they start "Time Compression", which leads to the final battle.

Cid Kramer

 is the headmaster of Balamb Garden. After the failed assassination attempt on Edea, the Garden Master, NORG, attempts to seize power from Cid and reconcile with Edea. This sparks an internal conflict, in which the students and personnel side with either Cid or NORG, but Squall and Xu quell the conflict and return Cid to power. Afterward, Cid aggressively confronts NORG, who started the conflict over financial issues. Cid is the husband of Sorceress Edea, with whom he ran an orphanage and founded the SeeD organization. They are estranged for most of the game, however, because they lead opposing factions until Ultimecia releases her magical possession of Edea.

Because most Final Fantasy titles include a character named "Cid", Nomura wanted to design someone with differences from the past Cids in the series. He gave this version of Cid the appearance and personality of an older, benevolent character who would watch over Squall's party and offer them advice and motivation. Nojima decided that this type of good-natured character would work best as the headmaster of Balamb Garden.

Ellone
 is a mysterious girl and the missing "Sis" of Squall's past. She has the ability to send a person's consciousness back in time and into the body of another, so they can experience the actions of that person. She uses this talent to send Squall's party into Laguna's past adventures, hoping that they would alter the past, but she eventually realizes that her abilities can only view history, not alter it. Ultimecia needs this power to achieve "Time Compression", so she uses Edea and the Galbadian military to find her.

Ellone is an important character in the story, tying the relationships between some of the characters, and being the primary objective of Ultimecia. However, Ellone's importance is mostly told in the flashbacks, and explained gradually. After Ellone's parents were killed by Esthar soldiers, under orders of sorceress Adel, she lived with Raine in the small Winhill village, where she also developed a close relationship with her adoptive uncle, Laguna. These peaceful times lasted until she was finally captured by Esthar. Then, Laguna travelled to Esthar to rescue her, at the same time he participated in Esthar's rebellion to overthrow Adel. After Adel's incarceration in space, Laguna having to remain in Esthar as president, and then Raine's death, Ellone moved to Cid and Edea's orphanage, where she became an older sister figure to Squall and the other orphans, and eventually she also followed Cid to Balamb Garden. Early in the game, Squall's party finds Ellone in the library of Balamb Garden, but the characters don't have further interactions. It is later explained that the "Guardian Forces" (GF) which the SeeDs use in battle cause memory loss, thus explaining why Squall doesn't remember Ellone, Edea and his past in the orphanage.

Fujin
 is a young woman with pale skin, short silver hair and an eye patch. She is a member of Balamb Garden's disciplinary committee with Seifer and Raijin; the three of them form a close "posse", even when Seifer leaves Garden. Fujin prefers to speak in terse sentences, often with only a single word, such as "RAGE!" and "LIES!" (in the Japanese version she only spoke in Kanji). Near the end of the game, she explains to Squall that she will temporarily break ties with Seifer because of his recent behavior. In battle, Fujin wields a chakram and uses wind-based magic. She shares her name with the Japanese god of wind, Fūjin.

Fujin and Raijin were to appear in Final Fantasy VII, but the designers excluded them due to their similarity to the Turks. In Kingdom Hearts II, a younger version of Fujin, named , appears as a member of Seifer's gang. She is voiced by Rio Natsuki in the Japanese version and by Jillian Bowen in the English version.

Raijin
 is a member of Balamb Garden's disciplinary committee with Seifer and Fujin; the three form a close "posse", as he calls it. Like Fujin, he supports Seifer when he betrays SeeD and Garden to side with Edea. Near the end of the game, he stands by Fujin's plea to the party to help save Seifer from himself. In the ending FMV, he celebrates catching a large fish until Fujin kicks him into the water. In battle, Raijin uses thunder-based magic and a bō staff with large weights on either end. He shares his name with the Japanese god of thunder, Raijin.

Raijin and Fujin were to appear in Final Fantasy VII, but the designers decided against it due to their similarity to the Turks. In Kingdom Hearts II, a younger version of Raijin, named , appears as a member of Seifer's gang. He is voiced by Kazuya Nakai in the Japanese version, and by Brandon Adams in the English version.

Ultimecia
 is the main antagonist of Final Fantasy VIII. Because she operates through the body of a possessed Edea to gain control of Galbadia, Ultimecia's existence is revealed only after possessing Rinoa to release Sorceress Adel from her orbital prison to take as a new host. A sorceress from the future, Ultimecia is capable of reaching her consciousness into the distant past via a special "Junction Machine" to possess other sorceresses. She seeks to achieve "Time Compression", which would cause all eras to merge; this would extinguish all life but her own as she becomes an omnipresent goddess. This would give her power on a par to Hyne the Great, who, according to the background had created the world.Squall: "What exactly is it that you want?" /Ultimecia: "A world of compressed time--where you shall worship me, the eternal and solitary being!" (Dissidia Final Fantasy)

In fact, Squall and the heroes do help Ultimecia start Time Compression, but they do so to confront her in her own time. After Squall and his party defeat Sorceress Adel, Adel transfers her power to Rinoa, then Ultimecia possesses Rinoa again, and Ellone uses her power to send their consciousness to the past, at which point Ultimecia starts Time Compression. At that moment, the heroes are able to travel to Ultimecia's distant future and defeat her. After the final battle and during an apparent decompression of time, the defeated Ultimecia transfers her powers to Edea at a point in the past. This action essentially triggers the sequence of events that form the game's plot, and creates a causal loop.

Ultimecia is the villainess representing Final Fantasy VIII in Dissidia: Final Fantasy, Dissidia 012 and Dissidia NT, where she is voiced by Atsuko Tanaka in Japanese and Tasia Valenza in English.

Minor characters
Biggs and Wedge

Biggs and Wedge are members of the Galbadian Army. Biggs is a major and Wedge is a lieutenant. After the main characters defeat the duo at Dollet, they are demoted in rank to lieutenant and private respectively. The protagonists encounter them again at the D-District Prison. A third meeting at the Lunatic Pandora does not result in conflict; instead, they quit the Galbadian army. They continue the Final Fantasy tradition of including two minor characters with the names "Biggs" and "Wedge".

General Fury Caraway
General Fury Caraway is a member of the Galbadian military who advises the main characters on their mission to assassinate Sorceress Edea. When Laguna left Galbadia, Caraway comforted Julia; eventually, they married and had a child, Rinoa. Caraway and Rinoa have a problematic relationship; he attempts to prevent her from participating in the assassination attempt. However, he later arranges her freedom from the D-District Prison.

Vinzer Deling
Vinzer Deling is the President of Galbadia. He appoints Sorceress Edea as a supposed "peace ambassador" to resolve Galbadia's political problems with other nations. His body double is defeated by SeeD and the Forest Owls resistance group. Edea kills him during her welcoming ceremony at Deling City and seizes power in Galbadia.

Mayor Dobe and Flo
Mayor Dobe is the leader of Fishermans Horizon, a town in the middle of a transoceanic highway between the continents of Galbadia and Esthar. He and his wife, Flo, detest violence and oppose the Garden's presence in their territory. Squall and his party save the Mayor from certain death when the Galbadian army invades the town.

Forest Owls
The Forest Owls are a small resistance faction that oppose the Galbadian occupation of Timber, a town in the eastern part of the continent. A man named Zone is the leader, and Rinoa and Watts are members. Most people of Timber are affiliated with a resistance group, although the Forest Owls are the only active ones.

Julia Heartilly
 is a pianist at a Galbadian hotel frequented by Laguna during his days as a soldier. After being secretly admired by Laguna for some time, Julia introduces herself, as depicted in one of the flashback sequences. Julia reveals to Laguna her dream of writing her own songs and becoming a singer. Laguna is shipped out on new orders the following day and the ensuing circumstances prevent him from returning. Julia eventually marries Galbadian military officer General Caraway and has a daughter, Rinoa. She also finds success with her song "Eyes on Me", which is also the game's theme song. She is killed several years before the start of the game in a car accident. Julia is the only character in the game with an explicit character theme, named "Julia", which is a piano arrangement of "Eyes on Me".

Raine
, later , is Laguna's second love depicted in the flashbacks. She finds him injured at the bottom of a cliff and brings him to her hometown of Winhill to recover. She is irked at first by Laguna's bad habits and reluctance to express himself outright, but the two grow close and marry. After Laguna becomes President of Esthar, his duties thwart his efforts to return to Winhill. Raine dies after giving birth to a child, who, along with Ellone, is taken away to Edea's orphanage. It is strongly implied by Ward and Kiros, as well as by gaming writers and fans, that Squall is their child.

Martine
Martine is the head of Galbadia Garden. His superior, Balamb Garden's master NORG, orders him to use SeeD members to carry out the assassination plot against Sorceress Edea. When Squall and his team travel to Galbadia Garden after fleeing Timber, Martine orders them to carry out the mission. He hopes that using Balamb Garden's SeeDs would deflect responsibility for the plot onto NORG. His actions trigger the conflict within Balamb Garden when Garden Master NORG tries to kill Headmaster Cid to appease Sorceress Edea after the mission fails. Afterward, the Galbadian military seizes Galbadia Garden and Martine flees to the pacifist city of Fishermans Horizon.

NORG
NORG is an exiled Shumi who lent Cid the money to build and develop the Garden and took the position of Garden Master upon its completion. NORG is more concerned about the revenue acquired by SeeD as a mercenary organization rather than its noble duty of opposing the Sorceress; he is considered a "black sheep" of the Shumi tribe. After hearing about a failed assassination attempt on Sorceress Edea, NORG begins to distrust Headmaster Cid and tries to seize control of Balamb Garden, causing a conflict between factions loyal to NORG and Cid. Feigning loyalty to the Sorceress, he attempts to kill the SeeDs who carried out the failed assassination. After he is defeated in battle, he enters a cocoon-like state. Shumis from the Shumi village later appear at the site of his defeat. They appear to have removed him from his cocoon by cracking it open. They also apologize for NORG's behaviour.

Dr. Odine
Dr. Odine is a scientist and magic researcher from Esthar. He discovered the GFs and junctioning and engineered a machine that mimics Ellone's power. Seventeen years before the game, he developed the necessary technology to allow Laguna to entomb Adel. As a researcher of the Lunatic Pandora, he also helps to prevent it from reaching Tears' Point and initiating a Lunar Cry. Odine also plays a role in the plot to destroy Ultimecia, explaining how to survive time compression.

Minor SeeD members
Several other SeeD members assist Squall's party. Dr. Kadowaki is the Balamb Garden doctor who tends to Squall's wounds after his fight with Seifer in the opening sequence. She also helps Headmaster Cid after his confrontation with NORG. Nida (another Star Wars reference, along with Biggs and Wedge) is a student at Balamb Garden who passes the SeeD exam along with Squall. He pilots Balamb Garden after it becomes a mobile base. Lastly, Xu''' is a high-ranking SeeD who helps Squall during the Dollet mission and the Garden civil war between NORG and Cid. She is friends with Quistis and a member of Squall's staff once he becomes the leader of Balamb Garden.

Merchandise
The characters of Final Fantasy VIII have spawned action figures, jewellery and other goods in their likeness. In 1999, action figure lineups were distributed in Japan by Bandai, Kotobukiya, Banpresto, and Coca-Cola. Bandai also released them to Europe and Australasia the same year. In 2004, action figures of Squall, Rinoa and Selphie were distributed in North America by Diamond Comics. Posters of individual characters or a collage of characters are available on many fan websites, including Final Fantasy Spirit. Other products available include mouse pads, keychains, and pens depicting individual characters or sets of characters.

Reception
The characters of Final Fantasy VIII have received praise by reviewers. The Gaming Age reviewer was originally concerned with the shift to consistently realistically proportioned characters, but he ultimately found them more appealing. Moreover, the review stated that the character designs and graphical quality allowed the characters to "convey emotions much more dramatically". Game Revolution cited similar praise, agreeing that the change "really makes the graphics impressive". Jeff Lundigran of IGN commented that the "low-polygon characters of Final Fantasy VII are gone, replaced with sometimes surprisingly realistic high-polygon models that only look better the closer they get". GameSpot agreed with the transition, claiming that "involving, personal, and emotional stories are far more believable when they come from, well, people, not short, bizarrely shaped cartoon characters".

The cast itself has received criticism from reviews. Lundigran criticized the manner in which romantic interactions play out, stating that "considering that the love story is so integral to everything that happens—not to mention forming the central image of the box art—it's incomprehensible why no one says 'I love you' to anyone, ever". With Squall, he felt that "FFVIII does break one cardinal rule: when your story is character centered, you'd better center it on a character the audience can care about. Squall, unfortunately, just doesn't fit the bill". However, GameSpot felt that Final Fantasy VIII shifts the story from the "epic" concepts of VII to the "personal", in that "the characters and their relationships are all extremely believable and complex; moreover, the core romance holds up even under the most pessimistic scrutiny". A later editorial by IGN's Ryan Clements echoed this sentiment, appreciating that Squall and Rinoa's single kiss during the finale serves "one of the player's main rewards for hours of dedication". Although the reviewer at Official U.S. PlayStation Magazine'' acknowledged possible fears over a romantic storyline, he wrote that "it's only later in the game, once you are really attached to all the distinct and complex characters, that the more emotional themes are gradually introduced".

References

External links
 Final Fantasy VIII character profiles — Square Enix USA

Final Fantasy 08
Final Fantasy VIII